Paralpenus is a genus of moths in the subfamily Arctiinae from the Afrotropics. The genus was described by Watson in 1988.

Species
 Paralpenus atripes (Hampson, 1909)
 Paralpenus flavicosta (Hampson, 1909)
 Paralpenus flavicosta punctiger (Hering, 1928)
 Paralpenus flavizonatus (Hampson, 1911)
 Paralpenus julius Kühne, 2010
 Paralpenus strigulosa (Hampson, 1901)
 Paralpenus ugandae (Hampson, 1916)
 Paralpenus wintgensi (Strand, 1909)
 Paralpenus wintgensi zimbabweiensis Dubatolov, 2011

References

Watson, A. (1989) "A review of Spilosoma-like Afrotropical tiger-moths (Lepidoptera: Arctiidae)". Entomologica Scandinavica. 19: 251–291.

Spilosomina
Moth genera